Vytautas Kubilius (November 23, 1928,  Aukštadvarys, Rokiškis district, Lithuania — February 17, 2004, Vilnius) was Lithuanian literary critic and political activist.

Kubilius was an author of numerous articles and monographs about Lithuanian literature and writers. He took part in Sąjūdis movement, and was a co-founder of the Lithuanian Citizens' Charter movement (Lietuvos piliečių chartija) and the chairman of its Council since 1991.

Kubilius was the father of Andrius Kubilius, a Lithuanian politician. He was fatally hit by a car at a crosswalk in Vilnius on February 17, 2004. He was awarded the Officer's Cross of the Order of the Lithuanian Grand Duke Gediminas (1998).

Works
 Julius Janonis. 1962.
 Naujų kelių ieškant. 1964.
 Salomėjos Nėries lyrika. 1968.
 Kazio Borutos kūryba. 1980.
 Ievos Simonaitytės kūryba. 1987.
 Antanas Vaičiulaitis. 1993.
 Jonas Aistis. 1999.
 Dviese literatūros sūpuoklėse: Kazys Puida ir Vaidilutė. 2003.
 XX amžiaus lietuvių poetai. 1980.
 XX amžiaus lietuvių lyrika. Vilnius: Vaga, 1982. 397 p.
 Lietuvių literatūra ir pasaulinės literatūros procesas. Vilnius: Vaga, 1983. 470 p.
 Žanrų kaita ir sintezė. 1986.
 Problemos ir situacijos. 1990.
 Romantizmo tradicija lietuvių literatūroje. Vilnius: Amžius, 1993. 206 p.
 XX amžiaus literatūra: Lietuvių literatūros istorija. Vilnius: Alma littera, Lietuvių literatūros ir tautosakos institutas, 1995. 719 p. .
 XX amžiaus lietuvių literatūra: Lietuvių literatūros istorija. 2-asis patais. leid. Vilnius: Alma littera, Lietuvių literatūros ir tautosakos institutas, 1996.
 Literatūra istorijos lūžyje. 1997.
 Teofilis Tilvytis (Теофилис Тильвитис). Moscow, 1958.
 Modern Lithuanian Poetry (Современная литовская поэзия). Moscow, 1969.
 Literatur in Freiheit und Unfreiheit. Die Geschichte der litauischen Literatur von der Staatsgrϋndung bis zur Gegenwart. Aus dem Litauschen von Cornelius Hell und Lina Pestal.

References

1928 births
2004 deaths
Lithuanian activists
Lithuanian academics
Lithuanian educators
Lithuanian literary historians
Lithuanian literary critics
Lithuanian male writers
Road incident deaths in Lithuania
Pedestrian road incident deaths
Commander's Crosses of the Order of the Lithuanian Grand Duke Gediminas
People from Rokiškis District Municipality